A number of other football rivalries are referred to as Eternal derby as well:

 Eternal derby (Albania), between KF Tirana and FK Partizani Tirana
 Eternal derby (Bosnia and Herzegovina), between FK Željezničar Sarajevo and FK Sarajevo
 Eternal derby (Bulgaria), between PFC Levski Sofia and PFC CSKA Sofia
 Eternal derby (Croatia), between GNK Dinamo Zagreb and HNK Hajduk Split
 Eternal derby (Cyprus), between APOEL FC and AC Omonia
 Eternal derby (Greece), between Olympiacos F.C. and Panathinaikos F.C.
 Eternal derby (Hungary), between Ferencvárosi TC and MTK Budapest FC
 Eternal derby (Montenegro), between FK Sutjeska Nikšić and FK Budućnost Podgorica
 Eternal derby (North Macedonia), between FK Vardar and FK Pelister
 Eternal derby (Romania), between FC Steaua București and FC Dinamo București
 Eternal derby (Serbia), between Red Star Belgrade and FK Partizan
 Eternal derby (Slovenia), between NK Maribor and NK Olimpija Ljubljana
 Eternal derby (Turkey), between Galatasaray S.K. and Fenerbahçe S.K.